Mongolicosa mongolensis is a species of wolf spider only known from Gurvanbulag district, Bayankhongor Province, Mongolia.

This spider, up to 8 mm in length, is dark brown in colour. There are pale bands on the carapace and a reddish heart-shaped mark on the abdomen although all body markings are poorly defined. The legs, however show clear pale banding.

References

Lycosidae
Spiders described in 2003
Spiders of Asia
Arthropods of Mongolia